Ancistrus mattogrossensis is a species of catfish in the family Loricariidae. It is a freshwater species native to South America, where it is known only from Brazil.

References 

mattogrossensis
Fish described in 1912